Santa Sofia is a comune (municipality) in the Province of Forlì-Cesena in the Italian region Emilia–Romagna, located about  southeast of Bologna and about  southwest of Forlì. The municipality of Santa Sofia is located in the Bidente river valley and is surrounded by the Foreste Casentinesi, Monte Falterona, Campigna National Park.

Santa Sofia borders the following municipalities: Bagno di Romagna, Civitella di Romagna, Galeata, Pratovecchio, Premilcuore, San Godenzo, Sarsina, Stia.

Main sights 
Santa Sofia is located within the Foreste Casentinesi, Monte Falterona, Campigna National Park.

Sights include:

Church of the Holy Crucifix, housing a 15th-century crucifix.
 Giardino Botanico di Valbonella, a nature preserve and botanical garden
Romanesque pieve at Corniolo, with a ceramics by the Della Robbia workshop
Sculpture Park, at Spinello

Notable people
Guelfo Zamboni, Italian diplomat and humanitarian
Pope Paschal II, head of the Catholic Church and ruler of the Papal States

References

External links
 Official website

Cities and towns in Emilia-Romagna